1710 Gothard, provisional designation , is a stony asteroid from the inner regions of the asteroid belt, approximately 9 kilometers in diameter. It was discovered on 20 October 1941, by Hungarian astronomer György Kulin at the Konkoly Observatory in Budapest, Hungary. It was later named after Hungarian amateur astronomer Jenő Gothard.

Orbit and classification 

The S-type asteroid orbits the Sun at a distance of 1.7–2.9 AU once every 3 years and 6 months (1,292 days). Its orbit has an eccentricity of 0.27 and an inclination of 8° with respect to the ecliptic.

Physical characteristics

Rotation period 

In October 2001 and October 2008, two rotational light-curves of Gothard were obtained by French amateur astronomers Laurent Bernasconi and René Roy, giving a concurring rotation period of 4.94 hours with a brightness variation of 0.31 and 0.32 in magnitude, respectively.

Diameter and albedo 

According to the survey carried out by NASA's Wide-field Infrared Survey Explorer with its subsequent NEOWISE mission, Gothard measures 9.84 kilometers in diameter, and its surface has an albedo of 0.087, while the Collaborative Asteroid Lightcurve Link assumes a standard albedo for stony asteroids of 0.20 and calculates a diameter of 5.66 kilometers with an absolute magnitude of 13.6.

Naming 

This minor planet was named in memory of Hungarian amateur astronomer Jenő Gothard (1857–1909), who discovered the central star in the Ring Nebula (M57). The official naming citation was published by the Minor Planet Center on 1 February 1980.

References

External links 
 Asteroid Lightcurve Database (LCDB), query form (info )
 Dictionary of Minor Planet Names, Google books
 Asteroids and comets rotation curves, CdR – Observatoire de Genève, Raoul Behrend
 Discovery Circumstances: Numbered Minor Planets (1)-(5000) – Minor Planet Center
 
 

 

001710
Discoveries by György Kulin
Named minor planets
19411020